TJI may refer to:
TJ Innova Engineering & Technology, Chinese automotive design company
Transitional Justice Institute, Ulster University, Northern Ireland
Trujillo Airport, Colón Department, Honduras (IATA code: TJI)

Tji may refer to:
Northern Tujia language, Sino-Tibetan language of China (ISO 639-3 code: tji)
Tji, a unit of weight equal to 3.8601 kg; see Indonesian units of measurement
 TJI joist, a construction framing component (trademarked by Weyerhaeuser) for I-joist
Tiago "Tji" Pereira, Portuguese rapper, YouTuber and streamer

People with the surname Tji include:
Daniel Tji Hak Soun, South Korean Roman Catholic priest